Grimm may refer to:

People
 Grimm (surname)
 Brothers Grimm, German linguists
 Jacob Grimm (1785–1863), German philologist, jurist and mythologist
 Wilhelm Grimm (1786–1859), German author, the younger of the Brothers Grimm
 Christian Grimm, German footballer
 Marco Grimm, German footballer

Places
 Grimm (Hamburg), Germany
 Grimmenturm, Zürich (Switzerland)

Film and television
 Grimm (TV series), a 2011 American series
 Grimm (film), a 2003 Dutch film
 The Brothers Grimm (film), a 2005 film starring Matt Damon and Heath Ledger

Other arts and entertainment
 Grimm (musical), a 2014 musical by Peter Lund and Thomas Zaufke
 Grimm (role-playing game), a role-playing game, released by Fantasy Flight Games
 Grimms, an English band

Fictional characters
 Grimm, an Advance Wars: Dual Strike character
 Grimm, a Mirror Mirror character
 Grimm, a Mother Goose and Grimm character
 Grimm the Dragon, a Princess Gwenevere and the Jewel Riders character
 Grimm, a Quick Change character
 Troupe Master Grimm, a Hollow Knight character
 Benjamin Grimm, a Fantastic Four comic book character
 Sister Grimm, a Runaways comic book character
 The Creatures of Grimm, monsters in the web series RWBY

See also
 
 Brothers Grimm (disambiguation)
 Grimm Tales (disambiguation)
 Grimms' Fairy Tales, a collection of fairy tales by the Brothers Grimm
 Grimm's law, a set of statements by Jacob Grimm about the changes in languages over time